Reeve is an English surname originally meaning officer or steward. Some notable persons with the surname include:

Ada Reeve (1874–1966), English actress
Alan Reeve (born 1948), English murderer
Arthur B. Reeve (1880–1936), American author
Arthur Stretton Reeve (1907–1981), Bishop of Lichfield
Arthur W.V. Reeve (1913 – c. 1994), Scouting New Zealand notable, awardee of the Bronze Wolf in 1979
Birdie Reeve Kay (1907–1996), American champion typist
C. D. C. Reeve (born 1948), American philosopher
Charlie Reeve, American psychologist
Cheryl Reeve, American basketball head coach
Chris Reeve (born 1953), American knife maker
Christopher Reeve (1952–2004), actor, director, producer and writer
Clara Reeve (1729–1807), English novelist
Dana Reeve (1961–2006), actress, singer and activist
Dermot Reeve (born 1963), former English cricketer
Donald Reeve (1923–1994), British civil engineer
Edward Reeve (1822–1889), Australian art patron and playwright
Ella Reeve Bloor (1862–1951), American labor organizer and activist
Elle Reeve, American correspondent
F.D. Reeve (1928–2013), American poet
Fred Reeve, English footballer
Geoffrey Reeve (1932–2010), British movie director and producer
Henry Reeve (journalist) (1813–1895), English journalist
Henry Reeve (soldier) (1850–1876), Brigadier General in Cuba's 'Ejército Libertador'
Herbert Reeve (1868–1956), English clergyman and missionary 
Isaac Van Duzen Reeve (1813–1890), soldier in the United States Army
James H. Reeve, UK broadcaster, journalist, raconteur and radio phone-in host
Jill Reeve (born 1969), former American field hockey defender
Joan Reeve (died 1929), alias of Grace Oakeshott, British activist for women's rights
Joel Reeve (1901–1988), pseudonym of American author William Robert Cox
John Reeve (religious leader) (1608–1658), English prophet and author
John Reeve (businessman), British CEO of Willis Group Holdings
John Reeve Lavell (1857–1925), lawyer and political figure in Ontario
John N. Reeve, American microbiologist
Ken Reeve, English footballer
Lovell Augustus Reeve (1814–1865), malacologist
Martin Reeve, British actor
Philip Reeve (born 1966), British author and illustrator
Robert Campbell Reeve (1902–1980), founder of Reeve Aleutian Airlines
Sally Reeve (born 1971), British actress
Simon Reeve (disambiguation)
Sue Reeve (born 1951), English long jumper
Tapping Reeve (1744–1823), American lawyer and law educator
Ted Reeve (1902–1983), multi-sport Canadian athlete and sports journalist
Thomas Reeve (1673–1737), British justice
William Reeve (disambiguation)
Wybert Reeve (1831–1906), English actor and stage manager with a significant career in Australia

See also
Reeve (disambiguation)
Reeves (surname)

References

English-language surnames
Occupational surnames
English-language occupational surnames